Bematistes persanguinea is a butterfly in the family Nymphalidae. It is found in south-western Uganda, Rwanda, Burundi and the Democratic Republic of the Congo (Mongala, Uele, Lualaba).

Taxonomy
See Pierre & Bernaud, 2014

References

External links
Images representing Acraea persanguinea at Bold

Butterflies described in 1914
Acraeini